In the Dutch language, the word t is a contraction of the article "het", meaning "the". 't can be found as a tussenvoegsel, a word that is positioned between a person's first and last name. Careful writers should use an apostrophe in front of the t – and not confuse it with a left quotation mark.

Examples 

 Dirk van 't Klooster
 Evert-Jan 't Hoen
 Gerard 't Hooft
 Haas Visser 't Hooft
 in 't Veld (surname)
 Bart Spring in 't Veld
 Sophie in 't Veld
 Jacobus Henricus van 't Hoff
 John van 't Schip
 Maarten 't Hart
 Tom van 't Hek
 Van 't Hof (surname)
 Van 't Wout (surname)
 Willem Visser 't Hooft
 Youp van 't Hek

See also 
 Definite article reduction, a similar contraction in some dialects of English

References 

Dutch language
Dutch grammar